The 1978–79 season was the first season involving foreign players. Al-Hilal won the championship for a second time.

Al-Tai and Al-Riyadh were relegated just one season after being promoted.

Stadia and locations

League table

Promoted:Al-Shabab, Al Ohud.
Full records are not known at this time

External links 
 RSSSF Stats
 Saudi Arabia Football Federation
 Saudi League Statistics
 Article writer for Saleh Al-Hoireny - Al-Jazirah newspaper 13-08-2010

Saudi Premier League seasons
Saudi
1978–79 in Saudi Arabian football